Clément Demeyer (born 1 September 1889, date of death unknown) was a Belgian footballer. He played in three matches for the Belgium national football team from 1912 to 1913.

References

External links
 

1889 births
Year of death missing
Belgian footballers
Belgium international footballers
Place of birth missing
Association football forwards